Freigraf is a title of Germany nobility. It is derived from the German words frei ("free") and the feudal title graf ("count"). It can be used in two different contexts: 
A feudal count with an unusually extended title (which may express an allodial status), notably in the part of the old realm of Burgundy that retains from this title its name: the Eastern French region of Franche-Comté.
A supreme executive of a vehmgericht. See League of the Holy Court.

German noble titles